Joseph Tyree Sneed III (July 21, 1920 – February 9, 2008) was a Republican United States Deputy Attorney General and then a United States circuit judge of the United States Court of Appeals for the Ninth Circuit for nearly 35 years until his death. He was the father of Carly Fiorina, a former CEO of Hewlett-Packard.

Early life

Joseph Tyree Sneed III was born on July 21, 1920 in Calvert, Texas. He was the son of Cara Carlton (Weber) and Harold Marvin Sneed (January 6, 1883 – Dec 27, 1934), a rancher and landowner. He spent his youth working summers as a cowboy on his uncle's ranch in the Texas Panhandle.

Sneed received his Bachelor of Business Administration degree from Southwestern University in 1941. He served as a Staff Sergeant in the Army Air Corps during World War II. Sneed attended the University of Texas School of Law, where he received his Bachelor of Laws, Order of the Coif in 1947. He was also a visiting student at the London School of Economics and the University of Ghana. He subsequently received a Doctor of Juridical Science from Harvard Law School in 1958.

Career

Academia

Sneed was an assistant professor of law at the University of Texas School of Law from 1947 to 1951. He became an associate professor in 1951 and was made a full professor in 1954. He taught at the University of Texas until 1957.

Sneed was a professor of law at Cornell Law School from 1957 to 1962, followed by the Stanford Law School from 1962 to 1971. He was professor of law and dean of the Duke University School of Law from 1971 to 1973.

Judicial service

Sneed was nominated by President Richard Nixon to a seat vacated (formerly occupied) by Judge Frederick George Hamley on the United States Court of Appeals for the Ninth Circuit on July 25, 1973. He was confirmed by the United States Senate on August 3, 1973, and received his judicial commission on August 24, 1973. He assumed senior status on July 21, 1987.

Sneed ruled in favor of three-strikes law; LGBT employment discrimination; and the eviction of substance abusers by their landlords. He was part of a three-judge panel that replaced Whitewater special prosecutor Robert B. Fiske with Kenneth Starr in 1994.

Personal life

Sneed married Madelon Juergens Sneed in 1944. She was a portrait and abstract artist who died in 1998. Together they had a son and two daughters, including Carly Fiorina. They resided in San Francisco, California.

Death

Sneed died on February 9, 2008, in San Francisco at the age of 87.

References

Sources

External links

 New York Times coverage of Whitewater
 www.netmagic.net
 Iraq Timeline (1994)

|-

|-

1920 births
2008 deaths
United States Army Air Forces personnel of World War II
California Republicans
Cornell University faculty
Duke University faculty
Harvard Law School alumni
Judges of the United States Court of Appeals for the Ninth Circuit
United States court of appeals judges appointed by Richard Nixon
20th-century American judges
Deans of law schools in the United States
Lawyers from San Francisco
People from Calvert, Texas
Southwestern University alumni
Stanford Law School faculty
University of Texas School of Law alumni
University of Texas at Austin faculty
United States Deputy Attorneys General
United States Army Air Forces soldiers